is a Prefectural Natural Park in southwest Tottori Prefecture, Japan. Established in 1994, the park spans the municipalities of Hino and Nichinan.

See also
 National Parks of Japan

References

External links
 Detailed map of Okuhino Prefectural Natural Park

Parks and gardens in Tottori Prefecture
Protected areas established in 1994
1994 establishments in Japan